Ginza is a district of Chūō, Tokyo, Japan

Ginza may refer to:

Geography
Ginza (agency), origin of the district name; a regulatory commission or guild, overseers of silver production in Edo period Japan
Ginza Line, a metro line in Tokyo, Japan
Ginza Station, a metro station in Tokyo, Japan
Togoshi-ginza Station, a metro station in Tokyo, Japan
Ginza stop, a MTR Light Rail Stop in Hong Kong
Ginza Plaza, a shopping mall in Singapore

Others
THE GINZA, a Japanese cosmetic brand owned by Shiseido
Ginza Samba, a Jazz song written by Vince Guaraldi
Ginza Musik, a Swedish mail order company 
Ginza Rabba, the central holy scripture of the Mandaean religion
"Ginza" (song), 2015 song by J Balvin

See also
Giza (disambiguation)